The 2005 Kansas City Royals season began on April 4 and ended October 2. The Royals competed and finished 5th in the American League Central with a record of 56 wins and 106 losses, 43 games behind first place Chicago White Sox. With 106 losses, the Royals set a record for the most losses in a single season in franchise history, and their third 100-loss season in 4 years. The 2005 Kansas City Royals were plagued by abysmal pitching and an anemic offense, and to date have one of the worst Major League Baseball season records of all-time. On August 31, the Royals became the first team to be eliminated from playoff contention.

Offseason
January 21, 2005: Denny Hocking was signed as a free agent with the Kansas City Royals.

Regular season

Season standings

Record vs. opponents

Roster

Player stats

Batting

Starters by position 
Note: Pos = Position; G = Games played; AB = At bats; H = Hits; Avg. = Batting average; HR = Home runs; RBI = Runs batted in

Other batters 
Note: G = Games played; AB = At bats; H = Hits; Avg. = Batting average; HR = Home runs; RBI = Runs batted in

Pitching

Starting pitchers 
Note: G = Games pitched; IP = Innings pitched; W = Wins; L = Losses; ERA = Earned run average; SO = Strikeouts

Other pitchers 
Note: G = Games pitched; IP = Innings pitched; W = Wins; L = Losses; ERA = Earned run average; SO = Strikeouts

Relief pitchers 
Note: G = Games pitched; W = Wins; L = Losses; SV = Saves; ERA = Earned run average; SO = Strikeouts

Farm system

Notes

References 
2005 Kansas City Royals team page at Baseball Reference
2005 Kansas City Royals team page at www.baseball-almanac.com

Kansas City Royals seasons
Kansas City Royals Season, 2005
Kansas